Rahmatabad (also Romanized as Raḩmatābād; also known as Raḩmābād) is a village in Esfandar Rural District, Bahman District, Abarkuh County, Yazd Province, Iran. At the 2006 census, its population was 120, in 23 families.

References 

Populated places in Abarkuh County